CID 3278 is a Malaysian police procedural action drama series produced by Suhan Movies & Trading, which was aired on TV9 from 9 August 2006 to 26 September 2007. It stars Kamal Affandi Hashim, Faizal Yusof, Salina Saibi, Along Eyzendy and Jesse Lim with Rosyam Nor making a special appearance. The series' theme song was composed and performed by M. Nasir.

Cast

Main characters
Season 1 (2006-2007)
 Kamal Affandi Hashim as ASP Wahab, leader of squad CID 3278
 Faizal Yusof as Inspector Azri
 Azman Nor as Detective Corperal Nasir
 Salina Saibi as Inspector Rita 
 Along Eyzendy (known as Eyzandy Aziz) as Detective Eddy
 Jesse Lim as Sargeant Chan but episode 7 he dies shot by Ray
 Azmi Hassan as Coperal Azmi
 Jayamara Raj Nadarajan as Detective

Season 2 (2007-2008) 
 Dato' Ahmad Tarmimi Siregar as Head of the CID KL
 Khir Mohd Noor as ASP Kamal, leader of Squad CID 3278 
 Faizal Yusof as Inspector Azri 
 Salina Saibi as Inspector Rita 
 Azman Nor as Detective Corperal Nasir 
 Along Eyzendy as Detective Eddy 
 Azlan Komeng as Jack, Ray's henchman

Guest actor/actress (following each episodes)
 Dian P.Ramlee as Inspector Rita's mother 
 Zainuddin Ismail as Inspector Azri's father
 Liyana Jasmay as Inspector Azri's wife 
 Zack Kool 
 Fizz Fairuz 
 Eric Chen 
 Kuni Muzaini 
 Qazem Nor 
 Izreen Azmida 
 Roy Azman

Special appearance
 Rosyam Nor as Ray

See also
 Gerak Khas (TV series) (since 1999)
 Metro Skuad (2012-2013)
 Roda-Roda Kuala Lumpur (1998-1999, 2008-2013)

References

External links
 TV9 sedia gempur Kosmo! via mforum1.cari.com.my 

TV9 (Malaysia) original programming
Malaysian drama television series
Police procedural television series
2006 Malaysian television series debuts
2007 Malaysian television series endings